The M 14/41 was a four-crew medium tank that served from 1941 in the Royal Italian Army. The official Italian designation was Carro Armato M 14/41. The tank was first employed in the North African Campaign where its shortcomings quickly became apparent.

History

Development
The M 14/41 was a slightly improved version of the earlier M 13/40 with a more powerful diesel engine. It was produced in limited numbers as it was already considered obsolete by the time of its introduction. The M 14/41 used the same chassis as the M13/40 but with a redesigned hull with better armour. The M 14/41 was manufactured in 1941 and 1942. Nearly 800 had been produced by the time production ended.

In combat

The tank was first employed in the North African Campaign. The vehicle was unreliable and cramped, and caught fire easily when hit. Following the withdrawal of Italian forces from North Africa the M14/41 was rarely encountered, though many captured vehicles were pressed into service by British and Australian forces to fill the serious shortage of Allied tanks in 1941. These vehicles did not remain in Allied service for long.

Units 
The first unit to receive the M14/41 was the X Tank Battalion "M" of the 133rd Tank Infantry Regiment. The other units assigned the tank were the following:

 IV Tank Battalion "M", 31st Tank Infantry Regiment (later transferred to the 133rd Tank Infantry Regiment)
 X Tank Battalion "M", 133rd Tank Infantry Regiment (later transferred to the 132nd Tank Infantry Regiment)
 XII Tank Battalion "M", 31st Tank Infantry Regiment (later transferred to the 133rd Tank Infantry Regiment)
 XIV Tank Battalion "M", 31st Tank Infantry Regiment
 XV Tank Battalion "M", 1st Infantry Division "Superga"
 XVI Mixed Tank Battalion, in Sardinia
 XVII Tank Battalion "M", 31st Tank Infantry Regiment
 XVIII Tank Battalion "M", reserve unit based in Italy, disbanded 8 September 1943
 LI Tank Battalion "M", 31st Tank Infantry Regiment (later transferred to the 133rd Tank Infantry Regiment)

Variants
The M 14/41 chassis served as the basis for the far more successful Semovente da 90/53 tank destroyer.

The prototype Carro Armato Celere Sahariano was developed on the M 14/41 chassis in 1943.

References
Notes

Bibliography

External links

M13/40, M14/41 Medium Tanks at wwiivehicles.com
Polish site about Fiat M14/41 with many pictures
Tanks encyclopedia: Carro Armato M14/41

Medium tanks of Italy
World War II tanks of Italy
Fiat armored vehicles
Gio. Ansaldo & C. armored vehicles
World War II medium tanks
Military vehicles introduced from 1940 to 1944